The 2007 Honghe Industrial China Open was a professional snooker tournament that took place between 25 March and 1 April 2007 at the Beijing University Students' Gymnasium in Beijing, China. It was the penultimate ranking event of the 2006–07 season, preceding the 2007 World Championship.

The defending champion was Mark Williams, but he lost in the first round 1–5 against Jamie Cope.

Graeme Dott won the tournament by defeating Cope 9–5 in the final.

Wildcard round

Main draw

Final

Qualifying

Qualifying for the tournament took place at Pontins in Prestatyn, Wales between 23 January and 26 January 2007.

Century breaks

Qualifying stage centuries

 141, 102  Matthew Couch
 141  Judd Trump
 136  Joe Jogia
 131  Paul Davies
 129, 115  Tian Pengfei
 128  Barry Pinches
 124  Tom Ford
 117  Mark Joyce
 114  Chris Norbury
 110, 100  Jamie Burnett

 109  Lee Spick
 108  Issara Kachaiwong
 106, 101  Ian Preece
 105  Mark Allen
 103  Liu Song
 103  Andrew Higginson
 103  Joe Delaney
 102  Jamie Jones
 102  Ricky Walden

Televised stage centuries

 145, 134, 104  Jamie Cope
 141  Neil Robertson
 137, 134, 110  Barry Hawkins
 137  Joe Perry
 130, 123  Ding Junhui
 128  Mark Davis
 126, 124, 118, 117, 106, 102  Graeme Dott
 124, 102  Stuart Bingham
 121, 120, 102  Mark Selby
 120  Ken Doherty
 118  Mark Allen
 113  Andy Hicks

 111  James Wattana
 110, 105, 100  Ronnie O'Sullivan
 110  John Higgins
 108  Matthew Stevens
 108  Stephen Hendry
 106  Adrian Gunnell
 104, 100  Marco Fu
 103  Ian McCulloch
 102  Stephen Maguire
 100  Anthony Hamilton
 100  Ali Carter

References

China Open (snooker)
China Open
Open (snooker)
Sports competitions in Beijing